Flagler College Tallahassee is a branch campus of Flagler College, a private liberal arts college in St. Augustine, Florida. It is hosted through Tallahassee Community College and was founded in 2000 as the product of a legislative mandate to expand opportunities for four year degree-seeking students. The campus offers bachelor's degree programs in six majors and four minors.

History 
This branch campus of Flagler College is the outcome of a combined effort between former Tallahassee Community College President T.K. Wetherell and past Flagler College President, and current Chancellor, William Proctor; the two were longtime colleagues, knowing each other from Wetherell's time playing for the Florida State Seminoles where Proctor served as assistant football coach.

When Florida's Legislature passed a mandate to increase opportunities for four year degree-seeking students through two year institutions, Wetherell contacted Proctor to begin development of a Flagler College branch through the TCC campus.  As a result, Flagler College Tallahassee opened its doors in the Fall Semester of 2000 with its first class of 56 students graduating in 2002.  The school has since produced over 2,800 graduates across multiple disciplines.

Academics 
The campus offers Bachelor of Arts and Bachelor of Science degrees. Admission is open to students who have earned an Associate of Arts (AA) degree, or 60 transferable college credits, in addition to meeting major requirements.  To be considered for acceptance, prospective students must provide an application for admission and sealed official transcripts from all schools attended. If transferring from TCC, a degree audit is required. The college's acceptance rate is an average of 60 percent of its annual applications.

References

External links 

Educational institutions established in 2000
Education in Tallahassee, Florida
Flagler College
2000 establishments in Florida